Mohamed Saleh Mallah (born February 15, 1938) (Arabic: محمد الصالح ملاح) known as Amar Mallah. Was an Algerian pioneer and writer. He is considered one of the few fighters who have several publications and books on the revolution and after the revolution, most notably the book “The December 14, 1967 Movement for Officers of the People’s National Army.”

Career 
Ammar Mallah was born on February 15, 1938, in El Madher, in the Batna Province. He joined the National Liberation Army immediately after the student strike in May 1956.

He fought especially in his village, Aïn Ou Ksir (El Madher in Jebel Bouarif), and surmounted to the ranks of responsibility in the field. He was promoted to State 1 assembly leader responsible for intelligence and communications in January 1962. He chose active duty in the People's National Army after independence in 1962.

He assumed several responsibilities within the People's National Army, including Commander of the Fifth Military Region (Batna) between 1962 and 1964, and Commander of the Fourth Military Region (Ouargla) between 1964 and 1965.

Ammar received military studies in the field of the Army Command and General Staff, at the Frunze Military Academy in Moscow, between 1965 and 1967. Then he joined the command center of the General Staff in Algiers, at the head of the Organization and Mobilization Office of the General Staff of the People's National Army.

He participated in the Movement of December 14, 1967 against President Houari Boumediene.

Attempt to Assassinate Boumediene 
Ammar was the field commander of the failed coup against President Houari Boumediene in April 1968, under the supervision of Colonel Tahir Zubairi in May 1968. The Revolutionary Court of Oran arrested him, and sentenced him to death in 1969. After spending 11 years in prison, President Chadli Bendjedid pardoned him and released him in April 1979.

Since 1990 commander Ammar Al-Mallah is a member of the National Organization of Mujahideen, and the President of the Association of the first of November 1954.

In January 2010, President Abdelaziz Bouteflika appointed Major Ammar El-Mallah to the Algerian National Assembly for the presidential third.

His works 
He has several books on the history of the Algerian revolution:

 The December 14, 1967 Movement of People's National Army Officers (Arabic: harakat 14 disambir 1967 lidubaat aljaysh alwatanii alshaebii), in 2004.
 Facts and Datums about the editorial revolution in Aures (Arabic: waqayie wahaqayiq ean althawrat altahririat bial'uwras), in 2003.
 Critical Stations in the First November 1954 Revolution (Arabic: mahataat hasima fi thawrat 'awal nufimbir 1954), in 2012.
 Leaders of the National Liberation Army - State (1) - Part One (Arabic: qadat jaysh altahrir alwatanii), in 2012.
 Leaders of the National Liberation Army - State (1) - Part Two (Arabic: qadat jaysh altahrir alwatanii), in 2012.
 Leaders of the National Liberation Army - State (1) - Part Three (Arabic: qadat jaysh altahrir alwatanii), in 2013.
 The First Historic state of the National Liberation Front and Army (Arabic: alwilaya al'uwlaa altaarikhia lijaysh wajabhat altahrir alwatanii), in 2017.

References 

21st-century Algerian writers
Algerian Arab nationalists
1938 births
Living people